Ampass is a municipality in the Innsbruck-Land District, Tyrol (Austria) situated at an altitude of 651 m, has an area of 7.9 km2 and 1793 inhabitants as January 2015.

Geography
Ampass is located on a terrace on the southern side of the Inn Valley, on an old salt road, from Hall in Tirol to Matrei am Brenner, currently Landesstraße L 38 (Ellbögener Straße). Ampass is connected directly to Innsbruck, which is 8 km far, with the road L 283 (Ampasser Straße). On the outskirts of the village is located the Taxerhof Lake, surrounded by a reed and a wet area, suitable to host herons and wagtails.

History

Origin
Ampass is likely to be inhabited in the fifteenth century BC as a result of a funerary urn, found on the hill, dating back to that period. A greater number of finds, such as arrowheads, bronze pins and beads, which have been found, dating back to the Hallstatt culture or to La Tène Culture. The Romans built a military road, which connected Hall in Tirol with Matrei am Brenner through Igls, Sistrans, Lans and Ampass. The only remaining evidence of the Roman period is a granite milestone 1.9 m high that is still in its original place, this was taken as a reference, in 1254, to delimit the boundary between the parishes of Wilten and Ampass. Ampass suffered in the seventh century, as the entire Tyrol, the invasion of Bavarii of which skeletal traces remain. In 1056 the Emperor Henry IV, Holy Roman Emperor, who succeeded at the age of six years to the death of his father Henry III, built a chapel, opened by the Bishop of Brixen, Altwin, and later elevated to "Royal Chapel".

In 1145 Ampass is mentioned for the first time in the documents as "Ambanes", a name derived from the Celtic meaning "between two rivers", at that time was under the jurisdiction of the Court of Sonnenburg. In 1313 it was elevated to municipality with its own fiscal autonomy and in that year 22 families were on the payroll as taxpayers. With the intensification of trade direct to the south, in 1552, the ancient Roman road has been renovated and enlarged. In 1634 the village was struck by the plague which decimated the population. In memory of the plague, along the road, on the hill "Sonnenbühel", was erected a votive stele known as "Viertelsäule"; it has become the Ampass emblem and it is the most famous Gothic stele in Tyrol.

During the Tyrolean rebellion there were several fights in the municipality, the insurgents were led by Josef Speckbacher, the Count Victor Dankl and Kaspar Sautner native of Ampass. Following the victory over the Bavarians and the French Ampass passed under the District Court of Hall in Tirol. Between 1840 and early 1900 the population, due to industrial expansion of Innsbruck, declined because people preferred to migrate to the city that offered better job opportunities. The "Viertelsäule" was damaged by unknown assailants in 1876, was restored and put back in its place; then it was restored in 1906 and in 1997 by Johannes Stephan Schlögl.

In the last years Ampass grew bigger in agriculture and residential communities.

Coat of arms
The coat of arms consists of green and white stripes, in the center of which is the "Viertelsäule", the symbol of Ampass erected in memory of the plague. The two green stripes represent the green meadows which surround the village and the white stripe symbolizes the "salt road". The coat was granted on January 22, 1974.

Population

Sights

Religious architecture

St. John the Baptist's Parish
In 1056 the Emperor Henry IV, Holy Roman Emperor built a chapel inaugurated by the Bishop of Brixen Altwin, high due to "Royal Chapel". In 1426 a new church was built in Gothic style dedicated to "St. John the Baptist" and in 1546 the church had gone to ruin because of the destruction of war and in 1567 was destroyed by fire. In 1574 the building was restored and reopened for worship, but an earthquake in 1698 destroyed it. The church was rebuilt in 1744 and was restored in Baroque style.

St. Vitus's Church
A church dedicated to Saint Vitus was built, in 1429, by carters who transported salt. In 1521 the church was rebuilt on the old foundations, and behind the altar are still visible the traces of the intercessions of the carters. Following the church restoration, were found frescoes with the insignia of Charles V, Holy Roman Empire, Aragon, Sicily, Hungary and Bohemia.

References

External links
 Town History (German)

Cities and towns in Innsbruck-Land District